Faidherbe–Chaligny is a station of the Paris Métro, named after the streets of Rue Faidherbe and Rue Chaligny.

History

The station opened on 5 May 1931 with the extension of the line from Richelieu–Drouot to Porte de Charenton. Rue Faidherbe is named after General Louis Faidherbe (1818–1889), who was Governor of Senegal between 1854 and 1861 and between 1863 and 1865. Rue Chaligny is named after the Chalignys who were a famous family of metal-founders from Lorraine.

The royal wallpaper factory, the Folie Titon, run by Jean-Baptiste Réveillon, was located here until its demolition in 1880. It helped the Montgolfier brothers build hot-air balloons, which were first tested here with humans on 19 October 1783, although the balloon was tethered to the ground. The Reveillon riot occurred at the Folie Titon on 28 April 1789, which was a harbinger of the French Revolution.

Places of interest
Nearby is the Fountain of Montreuil, created in 1719, which was used at that time to supply water to the butcheries in neighbouring Faubourg Saint-Antoine.
The district preserved artisanal trades, particularly ironwork and cabinet-making.
The principal entry to the Saint-Antoine Hospital is between the two metro entrances.
Many small restaurants surround the station.
The Palace of Woman, a reception centre for single women, is at the end of the Rue de Faidherbe.

Station layout

References
Roland, Gérard (2003). Stations de métro. D’Abbesses à Wagram. Éditions Bonneton.

Paris Métro stations in the 11th arrondissement of Paris
Paris Métro stations in the 12th arrondissement of Paris
Railway stations in France opened in 1931